Gudeodiscus suprafilaris is a species of air-breathing land snail, a terrestrial pulmonate gastropod mollusk in the family Plectopylidae.

Distribution
The distribution of Gudeodiscus suprafilaris includes Vietnam.

The type locality is "Tonkin, Quang-Huyen".

Ecology
It is a ground-dwelling species as all other plectopylid snails in Vietnam.

It co-occur with other plectopylids in Vietnam: with Gudeodiscus giardi and with Sicradiscus mansuyi. Gudeodiscus anceyi, Gudeodiscus francoisi and Gudeodiscus phlyarius live at geographically close sites to Gudeodiscus suprafilaris.

References

External links

Plectopylidae
Gastropods described in 1908